The Arrow Rock Lyceum Theatre is a regional Equity theater in Arrow Rock, Missouri. Opening in 1961, the theatre is located in an historic church building within the Arrow Rock Historic District, a National Historic Landmark District. The 416-seat auditorium host over 33,000 patrons a year, and is Missouri's oldest professional regional theater.

History
The theater was created in 1961, and for its first season performed three nineteenth century plays on a budget of 3,500 dollars. The venue was originally a "1872 Gothic Revival Style" Baptist Church, whose congregation had consolidated with others in town and no longer used the building. Two families, the Lawrences and the Argubrights co-owned the building and offered to let it be used as a theater. Henry Swanson, a professor at Columbia College was the first artistic director. In 1993, the theatre underwent a renovation project to expand the capacity of the venue. In 2004, the theaters dormitory was damaged by a fire. The community provided housing for the cast for the following three seasons. In 2019, the theatre was the first in the state to receive the “Missouri Historical Theatre” designation. The theatre celebrated its 60th anniversary in 2021.

Productions

2021
The Little Mermaid (musical)
Singin' in the Rain (musical)
Sister Act (musical)
Murder on the Orient Express
A Christmas Carol
Our Town
Charley's Aunt
Elvis (musical)

References

External links
 luceumtheatre.org

Arts organizations established in 1961
Theatre companies in Missouri
1961 establishments in Missouri
Regional theatre in the United States
Theatres in Missouri
Performing arts in Columbia, Missouri